Daniela Borelli dos Santos (born 1978), also known as Daniela Cook, is an Australian team handball player. She part of the Australian national team, and participated at the 2011 World Women's Handball Championship in Hungary and Brazil.

Indoor Handball Career 
She was part of the New South Wales state team for the Australian National Handball Championship and contributed to obtaining a gold medal in 2005, 2006 and 2008.

Beach Handball Career 
She was part of one of New South Wales team that won the Australian Championship silver medal in 2010, 2015 and gold medal in 2011, 2014, 2016.

Achievements 
2015 : Australian Beach Handball Championships - All Star Team (Best Right Wing player)
2016 : Australian Beach Handball Championships - All Star Team (Best Right Wing player)
2017: Australian Beach Handball Championships  - Most Valuable Player & Best Scorer

International Indoor Handball Career 
She was selected and represented Australia at the 2011 World Women's Handball Championship in Brazil and the 2013 World Women's Handball Championship in Serbia, she also represented Australia for the Oceanian Qualifiers in 2016.

International Beach Handball Career 
Currently selected to represent Australia for the World Championships 2018 in Russia. She is vice captain of the Australian team.

She also represented Australia for the following events:
 2017 World Games (Beach Handball) - Poland
 2014 Beach Handball World Championships - Brazil
 2013 World Games (Beach Handball) - Colombia
 2012 Beach Handball World Championships - Oman

References

1978 births
Living people
Australian female handball players